Brüggen is a village and a former municipality in the district of Hildesheim in Lower Saxony, Germany. Since 1 November 2016 it has been part of the town of Gronau.

References

Hildesheim (district)
Former municipalities in Lower Saxony